Dual specificity protein phosphatase 2 is an enzyme that in humans is encoded by the DUSP2 gene.

The protein encoded by this gene is a member of the dual specificity protein phosphatase subfamily.  These phosphatases inactivate their target kinases by dephosphorylating both the phosphoserine/threonine and phosphotyrosine residues.  They negatively regulate members of the mitogen-activated protein (MAP) kinase superfamily (MAPK/ERK, SAPK/JNK, p38), which are associated with cellular proliferation and differentiation. 

Different members of the family of dual specificity phosphatases show distinct substrate specificities for various MAP kinases, different tissue distribution and subcellular localization, and different modes of inducibility of their expression by extracellular stimuli.  This gene product inactivates ERK1 and ERK2, is predominantly expressed in hematopoietic tissues, and is localized in the nucleus.

References

Further reading

EC 3.1.3